Lieutenant commander (LCDR) is a senior officer rank in the United States Navy, the United States Coast Guard, the United States Public Health Service Commissioned Corps, and the National Oceanic and Atmospheric Administration Commissioned Officer Corps (NOAA Corps), with the pay grade of O-4 and NATO rank code OF-3. Lieutenant commanders rank above lieutenants and below commanders. The rank is also used in the United States Maritime Service . The rank is equivalent to a major in the United States Army, United States Air Force, United States Marine Corps, and United States Space Force.

When introducing a lieutenant commander, their full rank should always be used; however, in general conversation they are usually called "commander" even though they are not "full" commanders (which is one rank higher). Simply "lieutenant" is never used because it is one rank lower.

Promotion to lieutenant commander in the U.S. Navy is governed by United States Department of Defense policies derived from the Defense Officer Personnel Management Act of 1980. DOPMA guidelines suggest 80% of lieutenants should be promoted to lieutenant commander after serving a minimum of three years as lieutenants and after attaining nine to eleven years of cumulative commissioned service.

While lieutenant commander is the U.S. Navy's first commissioned officer rank to be selected by a board, lieutenant commanders are still considered to be junior officers due to their origin as "lieutenant, commanding".  This can be seen by lieutenant commanders not wearing the headgear embellishment (colloquially known as "scrambled eggs") on their combination covers.

The U.S. Coast Guard used its own rank system until World War I. In 1916, discontent grew among Coast Guard captains: By law, they ranked below a lieutenant commander in the U.S. Navy despite similar roles and duties. Pursuant to the Appropriations Act of 1918, the Coast Guard adopted the U.S. Navy rank structure to prevent disagreements over seniority.

There are two insignia used by lieutenant commanders.  On service khakis and all working uniforms, lieutenant commanders wear a gold oak leaf collar device, similar to the ones worn by majors in the United States Air Force and United States Army, and identical to that worn by majors in the United States Marine Corps. In all dress uniforms, they wear sleeve braid or shoulder boards bearing a single gold quarter-inch stripe between two gold half-inch strips (nominal size). In the case of officers of the U.S. Navy, above or inboard of the stripes, they wear their specialty insignia, notably a star for officers of the line, crossed oak leaves for Civil Engineer Corps.

See also
U.S. Navy officer rank insignia

References

Military ranks of the United States Navy
Military ranks of the United States Coast Guard